This is a list of famous or notable people born in, or associated with, the Borough of Woking in England, who have a Wikipedia page.

In addition to the town of Woking, the borough also includes the settlements of Brookwood, Knaphill, Pyrford, Byfleet and West Byfleet.

The first surviving record of the settlement is from Domesday Book of 1086, in which the manor appears as Wochinges.  The "monastery at Wocchingas" is mentioned in a  copy of an early 8th-century letter from Pope Constantine to Hedda, Abbot of Bermondsey and Woking.

List of notable people

Notes

References

Bibliography

External links

 Woking Borough Council

People from the Borough of Woking
People from Woking